Yelverton is an unincorporated community in Hardin County, in the U.S. state of Ohio.

History
Yelverton was laid out in 1858, and named for one Mr. Yelverton, a railroad promoter. A post office was established at Yelverton in 1862, and remained in operation until 1910.

References

Unincorporated communities in Hardin County, Ohio
1858 establishments in Ohio
Populated places established in 1858
Unincorporated communities in Ohio